Frank Fanning (born 28 November 1945) is  a former Australian rules footballer who played with Footscray in the Victorian Football League (VFL).

Notes

External links 
		

Living people
1945 births
Australian rules footballers from Victoria (Australia)
Western Bulldogs players
Kyabram Football Club players